Seward Township occupies the 6 mile square in southeast corner of Kendall County, Illinois. As of the 2010 census, its population was 4,455 and it contained 1,451 housing units.

History
Franklin was the original name of Seward Township. On November 14, 1850, the name changed to Seward, after William H. Seward, who served as governor of New York State and as a U.S. Senator from New York as well as Secretary of State in the Lincoln Administration.

Geography

It contains portions of Minooka and Joliet. U.S. Route 52 crosses the township east to west, and I-80 runs along the southern boundary of the township.

Demographics

Government
The township is governed by an elected Town Board of a Supervisor and four Trustees.  The Township also has an elected Assessor, Clerk, and Highway Commissioner.

References
 

Townships in Kendall County, Illinois
Townships in Illinois
1850 establishments in Illinois